Megachile impartita is a species of bee in the family Megachilidae. It was described by Mitchell in 1934. It has been found in Florida and California.

References

Impartita
Insects described in 1934